My Heart is the debut album by American R&B singer Donell Jones. It was released by LaFace Records on June 4, 1996 in the United States. After the dissolution of his group Porché, Jones turned to songwriting and production, writing songs for R&B group Jade from their 1994 second album Mind, Body & Song as well as co-writing for Usher's self-titled debut album in that same year. He signed a recording contract as a solo performer with LaFace under Untouchables Entertainment, a production company and record label founded by Heavy D. & The Boyz member Edward "Eddie F." Ferrell. Most of the album was produced by Jones himself with additional help from Ferrell's Untouchables Entertainment production team. The album featured three singles, including "In the Hood", "Knocks Me Off My Feet" and "You Should Know".

Track listing

Sample credits
 "Waitin' on You" contains samples of "The Way We Were", as performed by Gladys Knight & The Pips and "Can It Be All So Simple", as performed by Wu-Tang Clan
 "All About You" contains a sample of "Summer Madness", as performed by Kool & the Gang
 "You Should Know" contains a sample of "Player's Anthem", as performed by Junior M.A.F.I.A.
 "In the Hood (Remix)" contains a sample of "Computer Love", as performed by Zapp
 "The Only One You Need" contains a sample of Shook Ones (Part II)", as performed by Mobb Deep

Personnel 
Credits adapted from Allmusic. 
 Keyboards: Donell Jones, Eddie F., Darin Whittington, Mookie, Mark Sparks, Kenny Tonge
 Drum Programming: Donell Jones, Eddie F., Darin Whittington, Mookie, Mark Sparks, Kenny Tonge
 Trumpet: Joseph Morant
 Background vocals: Donell Jones, Shelene Thomas, Tia Whittington, Chico DeBarge, Patria, Erik Milteer
 Recording engineer: Scott Hollingsworth, Darin Whittington, Joe Quinde, Jason DeCosta, Kenny Ifill, Kenny Tonge
 Mixing: Scott Hollingsworth, Kenny Ortiz, Paul Logus, Rich Travali, Dave Daschinger, Chris Tergersun
 Executive producer: Edward "Eddie F." Ferrell, Antonio M. Reid, Kenneth B. Edmonds
 Mastering: Herb Powers at The Hit Factory
 Photography: John F. Cooper
 Art direction: D.L. Warfield
 Design: Ron Jaramillo

Charts

Weekly charts

Year-end charts

References

External links
[ My Heart] at Allmusic

1996 debut albums
Donell Jones albums
LaFace Records albums